The Belgian Basketball Cup (Dutch: Beker van België), for sponsorship reasons the EuroMillions Cup, is the top tier national basketball cup competition in Belgium. The tournament is played in a knock-out format, in which teams are drawn against each other. Oostende is the most successful club in the competition's history, as it won 19 titles. Antwerp Giants are the last team to have won the Cup, having won the 2023 edition.

History

In 2013, the cup got a new name in The Base Cup, referring to the new main sponsor Base. The mobile telephony provider signed a sponsorship contract for 3 years. This led to, in the 2013–14 season, the first time a Final Four was held instead of semi-finals with two legs since 2003.

Format
Teams from the Basketball League Belgium Division I, the Top Division 1 and Top Division 2 (the first three divisions in Belgian basketball) compete in the competition. In the first round teams from the Top Division I and 2 play in 12 groups. From the second round, teams from the BLB Division I enter the competition. In the second round, the quarter- and semi-finals a double legged format is used. When a Division I team faces off against a team from a lower league, no second leg is played. The Final is decided by a single game.

Sponsorship names
Due to sponsorship reasons, the cup competition has known several names:
Base Cup (2013–2016)
bpost cup (2016–2019)
EuroMillions Cup (2020–)

Finals

See also 
Belgian Basketball Cup MVP

Notes

References

External links
Basket Belgium Cup – Men
Belgian Basketball Cup at Flashscores

 
Basketball cup competitions in Europe